Thomas Blackwood (10 February 1773 –  22 November 1842)  was born in Scotland and came to Canada in 1790 and was employed in the mercantile trade at Quebec.

Blackwood was employed by John Blackwood , a wealthy businessman, who does not appear to have been a relative. He  next joined James McGill  and operated the Great Lakes fur trade in Michilimackinac at Mackinac Island for McGill's company.

References 

 

1773 births
1842 deaths
Canadian merchants
Scottish emigrants to Canada
Businesspeople from Quebec